Cymothoe aubergeri, or Auberger's yellow glider, is a butterfly in the family Nymphalidae. It is found in Guinea, eastern Ivory Coast and Ghana. The habitat consists of forests.

References

Butterflies described in 1977
Cymothoe (butterfly)